Barbeque Dog is an album by Ronald Shannon Jackson and The Decoding Society, recorded in 1983 for the Antilles label.

In 2020, Jackson issued a remastered edition (subtitled "The Live Album VS The Original") on his Bandcamp page, featuring a "Live Jam" plus versions of "Gossip," "Barbecue Dog," and "Trials of Honest John" alternating with the original versions.

Reception

The AllMusic review by Brian Olewnick stated: "Barbecue Dog doesn't quite reach the explosive heights of its predecessor (Mandance), but is arguably the next best item in Jackson's discography. The band strikes a comfortable balance between the horns and the electric instruments, allowing each to surface when needed, and also complements the required barnburners with more contemplative pieces."

Track listing
All compositions by Ronald Shannon Jackson except where noted.
 "Barbeque Dog" - 4:21
 "Trials of an Honest John" - 3:23
 "Yugo Boy" - 3:09
 "Say What You Will" (Vernon Reid) - 3:14
 "Mystery at Dawn" - 4:38
 "Gossip" - 5:48
 "When Cherry Trees Bloom in Winter, You Can Smell Last Summer" - 5:28
 "Harlem Opera" - 9:02

Personnel
Ronald Shannon Jackson – drums, flute, bass flute, Bertoia sound sculpture, voice
Henry Scott – trumpet, flugelhorn, percussion, voice
Zane Massey – tenor saxophone, alto saxophone, soprano saxophone, percussion, voice
Vernon Reid – electric guitar, steel guitar, Roland guitar synthesizer, banjo, percussion, voice
Melvin Gibbs – electric bass, percussion, voice
Reverend Bruce Johnson – fretless electric bass, electric bass, piccolo bass, percussion, voice

References

1983 albums
Ronald Shannon Jackson albums
Antilles Records albums